Appuntamento in riviera is a 1962 Italian "musicarello" comedy film directed by Mario Mattoli and starring Tony Renis. It contains the original song "Quando, quando, quando", performed by one of its writers, Tony Renis.

Cast
 Tony Renis as Tony
 Graziella Granata as Laura
 Francesco Mulé as Marengoni
 Piero Mazzarella as Cazzaniga
 Maria Letizia Gazzoni as Patrizia
 
 
 Santo Versace as Carlo
 Toni Ucci as Giacomo
 
 Mimmo Palmara as De Marchi

External links
 

1962 films
1962 musical comedy films
1960s Italian-language films
Films directed by Mario Mattoli
Musicarelli
1960s Italian films